The Battle of Valvasone (16 March 1797), also named Battle of Tagliamento, saw a First French Republic army led by Napoleon Bonaparte attack a Habsburg Austrian army led by Archduke Charles, Duke of Teschen. The Austrian army fought a rear guard action against the French vanguard led by Jean-Baptiste Bernadotte at the crossing of the Tagliamento River but was defeated and withdrew to the northeast. The French troops crossed the river at Valvasone and the battle developed on the opposite bank, mainly between the little villages of Gradisca (now in the municipality of Sedegliano) and Goricizza (now in the municipality of Codroipo). The next days, a French division cut off and captured an Austrian column at Gradisca d'Isonzo (Capitulation of Gradisca). The actions occurred during the War of the First Coalition, part of the French Revolutionary Wars.

Bonaparte saw the Siege of Mantua to a successful conclusion when Dagobert Sigmund von Wurmser surrendered on 2 February 1797. The French commander cleared his south flank by Claude Perrin Victor's  victory over the Papal States at the Battle of Faenza the following day. Meanwhile, Emperor Francis II of Austria recalled Archduke Charles from Germany to hold northeast Italy. In March Bonaparte launched an offensive designed to break through the Austrian army's defenses. At Valvasone, the French encountered part of their opponents' army and drove it back. For the loss of 500 men, the French inflicted 700 casualties on the Austrians and captured six guns.

The following day, Bernadotte's French division isolated an enemy column and forced its surrender at Gradisca d'Isonzo. A total of 2,500 Austrian soldiers, 10 artillery pieces, and eight colors were captured. When several retreating Austrian columns made for the Tarvis Pass to the northeast, the French raced to cut them off. The Battle of Tarvis occurred over three days beginning on 21 March as the Austrians struggled to escape. Bonaparte's forward thrust carried his army within  of Vienna, where the Preliminaries of Leoben were concluded in mid-April 1797.

References

Battles involving France
Battles involving Austria
Battles of the French Revolutionary Wars
Battles of the War of the First Coalition
Conflicts in 1797
1797 in Italy
Battles inscribed on the Arc de Triomphe